Uli the Tenant (German: Uli, der Pächter) is a 1955 Swiss comedy drama film directed by Franz Schnyder and starring Liselotte Pulver, Hannes Schmidhauser and Emil Hegetschweiler. Based on a classic 1849 novel by Jeremias Gotthelf, it was made as a sequel to the hit 1954 film Uli the Farmhand.

The film was shot at the Rosenhof Studios in Zurich and on location across Switzerland.

Cast

References

Bibliography 
 Goble, Alan. The Complete Index to Literary Sources in Film. Walter de Gruyter, 1999.

External links 
 

1955 films
1950s historical comedy-drama films
Swiss historical comedy-drama films
Swiss German-language films
Films directed by Franz Schnyder
Films based on Swiss novels
Films set in the 19th century
Films set in the Alps
Adaptations of works by Jeremias Gotthelf
Swiss black-and-white films